Hon Hai Precision Industry Co., Ltd., trading as Hon Hai Technology Group in China and Taiwan and Foxconn internationally, is a Taiwanese multinational electronics contract manufacturer established in 1974 with headquarters in Tucheng, New Taipei City, Taiwan. In 2021, the company's annual revenue reached  and was ranked 20th in the 2022 Fortune Global 500. It is the world's largest technology manufacturer and service provider. While headquartered in Taiwan, the company earns the majority of its revenue from assets in mainland China and is one of the largest employers worldwide. Terry Gou is the company founder and former chairman.

Foxconn manufactures electronic products for major American, Canadian, Chinese, Finnish, and Japanese companies. Notable products manufactured by Foxconn include the BlackBerry, iPad, iPhone, iPod, Kindle, all Nintendo gaming systems since the GameCube (except subsequent Nintendo DS models), Nokia devices, Cisco products, Sony devices (including the PlayStation 3 and PlayStation 4 gaming consoles), Google Pixel devices, Xiaomi devices, every successor to Microsoft's first Xbox console, and several CPU sockets, including the TR4 CPU socket on some motherboards. As of 2012, Foxconn factories manufactured an estimated 40% of all consumer electronics sold worldwide.

Foxconn named Young Liu its new chairman after the retirement of founder Terry Gou, effective on 1 July 2019. Young Liu was the special assistant to former chairman Terry Gou and the head of business group S (semiconductor). Analysts said the handover signals the company's future direction, underscoring the importance of semiconductors, together with technologies like artificial intelligence, robotics, and autonomous driving, after Foxconn's traditional major business of smartphone assembly has matured.

History

Terry Gou established Hon Hai Precision Industry Co., Ltd. as an electrical components manufacturer in 1974 in Taipei County, Taiwan Province. Foxconn's first manufacturing plant in Mainland China opened in Longhua Town, Shenzhen in 1988.

One of the important milestones for Foxconn occurred in 2001 when Intel selected the company to manufacture its Intel-branded motherboards instead of Asus. By November 2007, Foxconn further expanded with an announced plan to build a new US$500 million plant in Huizhou, Southern China.

In January 2012, Foxconn named Tien Chong (Terry) Cheng chief executive of its subsidiary FIH Mobile Limited. He resigned the same year, citing health problems. At this time, Foxconn made up approximately 40% of worldwide consumer electronics production.

Expansion was further pursued after a March 2012 acquisition of a 10-percent stake in the Japanese electronics company Sharp Corporation for US$806 million and to purchase up to 50 percent of the LCDs produced at Sharp's plant in Sakai, Japan. However, the agreed deal was broken as Sharp's shares continued to plunge in the following months. In September 2012, Foxconn announced plans to invest US$494 million in the construction of five new factories in Itu, Brazil, creating 10,000 jobs.

In 2014, the company purchased Asia Pacific Telecom and won some spectrum licenses at an auction, which allowed it to operate 4G telecommunications equipment in Taiwan.

On 25 February 2016, Sharp accepted a ¥700 billion (US$6.24 billion) takeover bid from Foxconn to acquire over 66 percent of Sharp's voting stock. However, as Sharp had undisclosed liabilities which was later informed by Sharp's legal representative to Foxconn, the deal was halted by Foxconn's board of directors. Foxconn asked to call off the deal, but it was proceeded by the former Sharp president. Terry Gou, in the meeting, then wrote the word "義," which means "righteousness," on the whiteboard, saying that Foxconn should honor the deal. A month later, on 30 March 2016, the deal was announced as finalized in a joint press statement, but at a lower price.

In 2016, Foxconn, together with Tencent and luxury-car dealer Harmony New Energy Auto, founded Future Mobility, a car start up that aimed to sell all-electric fully autonomous premium cars by 2020. A Foxconn unit, Foxconn Interconnect Technology, acquired Belkin International for $866m on 26 March 2018.

In July 2019, Foxconn appointed Liu, Young-Way as the new chairman of the Group, which was then ranked 25th among Forbes Top 100 Digital Companies. Soon afterward, Foxconn, led by Young Liu, introduced its “3+3 Model for Transformation, prioritizing the three key industries: electric vehicles, digital health, and robotics industries. The Group is also committed to developing artificial intelligence, semiconductors, and next-generation communication technologies, building blocks in the Group's technology strategy.

In 2020, Foxconn established “Hon Hai Research Institute,” with five research centers, each having an average of 40 high technology R&D professionals, all of whom are focused on the research and development of new technologies, the strengthening of Foxconn’s technology, and product innovation pipeline, efforts to support the Group’s transformation from “brawn” to “brains,” and the enhancement of the competitiveness of Foxconn’s “3+3” strategy.

Foxconn’s 2020 revenue was NT$5.36 trillion (US$193 billion). Circuits Assembly magazine named Foxconn the largest electronics manufacturing services company in the world for the 14th straight year.

On 5 February 2020, Foxconn started producing medical masks and clothing at its Shenzhen factory in China during the Chinese New Year and the height of the COVID-19 pandemic. The company initially said the masks it makes would be for internal employee use. The outbreak of coronavirus disease 2019 led to a worldwide spike in demand for masks, resulting in global shortages. In a letter to employees, Chairman Young Liu said, "I remember clearly how touching it was when Longhua Park produced our first mask at 4:41am on 5 February. It was the simplest yet most important product Foxconn has ever made. It not only supplied the group's need for epidemic prevention it also contributed to the general public and boosted the morale of the group. All that resulted from our colleagues' hard work."

Following almost a year of public controversy regarding its COVID-19 vaccine shortage; in June 2021, Taiwan agreed to allow founder Terry Gou, through his Yongling Foundation charity, to join with contract chip maker TSMC, and negotiate purchasing COVID-19 vaccines on its behalf. In July 2021, BioNTech's Chinese sales agent Fosun Pharma announced that Foxconn and TSMC had reached an agreement to purchase 10 million BioNTech COVID-19 vaccines from Germany for Taiwan. The two technology manufacturers pledged to each buy five million doses for up to $175 million, for donation to Taiwan's vaccination program.

In 2020, Foxconn initiated MIH Alliance to create an open EV ecosystem that promotes collaboration in the mobility industry, with more than 2,200 companies joining the open standard since its launch. The company announced plans to become more involved as a contract assembler of EVs. In the same year, Foxconn partnered with Fiat Chrysler Automobiles N.V. and Yulon Group for a move into EVs. Foxconn has been holding the Hon Hai Tech Day (HHTD) event since 2020 to showcase its latest achievements. In HHTD21, Foxconn introduced for the first time three self-developed EV models: the Model C recreational vehicle, the Model E sedan, and the Model T electric bus.

In January 2021, Foxconn and Geely Holding Group signed a strategic cooperative agreement and will establish a joint venture company to provide OEM and customized consulting services relating to whole vehicles, parts, intelligent drive systems, and automotive ecosystem platforms to global automotive enterprises and ridesharing companies. In February 2021, it announced an agreement with EV startup Fisker Inc. to jointly produce more than 250,000 vehicles a year. In March 2021, Foxtron, the JV company of Foxconn and Yulon, announced cooperation with Nidec to strengthen the power on EV key component development.

In July 2021, Foxconn teamed up with CTBC Financial Holding Co., Ltd to create a new fund targeting EV investments. In June 2021, Foxconn invested T$995.2 million ($36 million) in Gigasolar Materials Corp to develop EV battery materials. In September 2021, Foxconn collaborated with Thailand’s state-owned oil supplier PTT Public Co. to invest US$1–2 billion in launching an EV joint venture in Thailand. In the same month, Foxconn and Gogoro formed a strategic technology and manufacturing partnership to introduce new levels of manufacturing capabilities and scale for Gogoro battery swapping technologies and Smart Scooters. In October 2021, it agreed to purchase a former GM auto plant from Lordstown Motors and to purchase $50 million of the company's common stock. Under the agreement, Foxconn would use the plant to produce Lordstown's Endurance pickup truck. Fisker vehicles would also be made at the same plant.

In January 2022, Foxconn signed an MoU with the Indonesian Ministry of Investment/BKPM, IBC, Indika, and Gogoro to jointly develop a sustainable new energy ecosystem in Indonesia that focuses on electric batteries, electric mobility, and associated industries. In May 2022, Foxconn announced the completion of the Lordstown Motors facility purchase and further signed a contract manufacturing agreement and a joint venture agreement with LMC for product development.

In mid-2021, Foxconn announced that the company will enter into more semiconductor production and will be expanding into supplying chips for electric vehicles (EVs) and electronics equipment used for healthcare. In May 2021, Foxconn and Yageo Group entered into a joint venture agreement to form XSemi Corporation (“XSemi”) to extend the businesses into the semiconductor industry, including product development and sales. Based in Hsinchu, Taiwan, XSemi aims to consolidate the strengths and resources of the two market leaders, in addition to the upcoming multifaceted collaborations with leading semiconductor companies in product design, process and capacity planning, and sales channel. In August 2021, Foxconn acquired a Macronix 6-inch Wafer Fab for US$90.8mn. 

In February 2022, Foxconn formed a joint venture company with Vedanta Limited, one of India’s leading multinational groups, to manufacture semiconductors in India. In April 2022, it was announced Foxconn had acquired the wireless telecommunications company, arQana Technologies - with the new organization being rebranded as “iCana". Foxconn also announced a merger with the integrated circuit designing firm AchernarTek for an undisclosed amount. The acquisition and consolidation will help Foxconn develop semiconductors for the automotive sector and 5G infrastructure. In September 2022, Foxtron, the automotive division of Foxconn works with Luxgen to launch its first electric vehicle, Luxgen n7.

In March 2023, Foxconn announced its revenue for the previous month fell by 11,65% when compared to the same period of the last year. This fall in revenue was explained by weaker demand for electronics.

International operations
Foxconn has 137 campuses and offices in 24 countries and areas around the globe. The majority of Foxconn's factories are located in East Asia, with others in Brazil, India, Europe, and Mexico.

Mainland China

Foxconn has 12 factories in nine Mainland Chinese cities—more than in any other country.

The largest Foxconn factory is located in Longhua Subdistrict, Shenzhen, where hundreds of thousands of workers (varying counts include 230,000, 300,000, and 450,000) are employed at the Longhua Science & Technology Park, a walled campus sometimes referred to as "Foxconn City".

While some workers live in surrounding towns and villages, others live and work inside the complex; a quarter of the employees live in the dormitories.

Another Foxconn factory "city" is located at Zhengzhou Technology Park in Zhengzhou, Henan province, where a reported 120,000 workers were employed as of 2012, later, 200,000 workers were employed as of November 2022. The park produces the bulk of Apple's iPhone line and is sometimes referred to as "iPhone City".

Foxconn's future expansion include sites at Wuhan in Hubei province, Kunshan in Jiangsu province, Tianjin, Beijing, Huizhou and Guangzhou in Guangdong province, China. A Foxconn branch that primarily manufactures Apple products is Hongfujin.

On 25 May 2016, the BBC reported that Foxconn replaced 60,000 employees because it had automated "many of the manufacturing tasks associated with their operations." The organization later confirmed those claims.

In July 2021, the Henan floods hit the world’s biggest Apple iPhone assembly plant in Zhengzhou, but production was not affected.

On 21 October 2022, and in response to a Covid outbreak at Zhengzhou Technology Park, "Foxconn imposes restrictions," including travel restrictions "on iPhone assembly plant, with dine-in meal facilities closed." On 31 October 2022, after the Covid outbreak forced the staff to spend lockdown in the factory, many workers have jumped the fence in order to escape. On 2 November 2022, the government imposed the lockdown to the Zhengzhou Airport Economy Zone, where the Foxconn factory is situated. On November 23, workers clashed with law enforcement over the harsh COVID restrictions and claims that Foxconn failed to provide the salary packages that were promised to new hires. Videos circulated on Chinese social media depicting law enforcement being protesting workers as well as large crowds of workers fighting back law enforcement.

Brazil
All company facilities in South America are located in Brazil, and these include mobile phone factories in Manaus and Indaiatuba as well as production bases in Jundiaí, Sorocaba, and Santa Rita do Sapucaí. The company is considering further investments in Brazil.

Europe
Foxconn has factories in Hungary, Slovakia, and the Czech Republic. As of 2011 it was the second-largest exporter in the Czech Republic.

India
As of mid-2015, Foxconn was in talks to manufacture Apple's iPhone in India. In 2015, Foxconn announced that it would be setting up twelve factories in India and would create around one million jobs. It also discussed its intent to work with the Adani Group for expansion in the country. In August 2015, Foxconn invested in Snapdeal. In September 2016 Foxconn started manufacturing products with Gionee. In April 2019 Foxconn reported that they are ready to mass-produce newer iPhones in India. Its Chairman Terry Gou said that the manufacturing will take place in the southern city of Chennai. In September 2022, Foxconn signed a deal for a Chip Making Facility in Gujarat, India with an investment of $21 billion, by Vedanta group.

Japan
Foxconn and Sharp Corporation jointly operate two manufacturing plants specializing in large-screen televisions in Sakai, Osaka. In August 2012, it was reported that Sharp, while doing corporate restructuring and downsizing, was considering selling the plants to Foxconn. The company was believed to be receptive to the plan. The acquisition was completed with a $3.8 billion deal in August 2016.

Malaysia

As of 2011, Foxconn had at least seven factories in the Johor state, at Kulai, where it is developing an industrial park that includes four factories that comprise fully automated assembly lines as well as fully automated packaging lines.

Mexico
Foxconn has a facility in San Jerónimo, Chihuahua that assembles computers, and two facilities in Juáreza former Motorola production base that manufactures mobile phones, and a set-top box factory acquired from Cisco Systems. LCD televisions are also made in the country in Tijuana at a plant acquired from Sony.

On June 2, 2022, Foxconn announced that their Mexico-based production plant had been hit by a ransomware attack in late May, disrupting production. The facility affected was located in Tijuana, Baja California and specializes in the production of consumer electronics, medical devices, and industrial products.

South Korea
The company invested $377 million in June 2014 to pick up a 4.9 percent shareholding in a South Korean IT services provider, SK C&C.

United States

Foxconn announced on 26 July 2017 that it would build a $10 billion TV manufacturing plant in southeastern Wisconsin and would initially employ 3,000 workers (set to increase to 13,000). As part of the agreement, Foxconn was set to receive subsidies ranging from $3 billion to $4.8 billion (paid in increments if Foxconn met certain targets), which would be by far the largest subsidy ever given to a foreign firm in U.S. history. Some estimate that Foxconn is expected to contribute $51.5 billion to Wisconsin's GDP over the next 15 years, which is $3.4 billion annually. However, numerous economists have also expressed skepticism that the benefits would exceed the costs of the deal. Others have noted that Foxconn has made similar claims about job creation in the past which did not come to fruition.

Foxconn was also exempted by Governor Scott Walker from filing an environmental impact statement, prompting criticism from environmentalists. The plant was estimated to contribute significantly to air pollution in the region. Environmentalists criticised the decision to allow Foxconn to draw  of water per day from Lake Michigan. Given water concerns, Foxconn is spending $30 million on zero liquid discharge technology. Foxconn is also required to replace wetlands at a higher ratio than other companies; Foxconn must restore 2 acres of wetland for every 1 acre disturbed instead of the ratio of 1.2 to 1 for other companies.

As of 4 October 2017, Foxconn agreed to locate their plant in Mount Pleasant, Wisconsin, and broke ground for the plant 28 June 2018. President Trump was in attendance to promote American manufacturing.

In January 2019, Foxconn said it was reconsidering its initial plans to manufacture LCD screens at the Wisconsin plant, citing high labour costs in the United States.

Under a new agreement announced in April 2021, Foxconn will reduce its planned investment to $672 million with 1,454 new jobs. Tax credits available to the project were reduced to $8 million.

In October 2021, Lordstown Motors announced a $250 million deal to sell a former GM plant to Foxconn, which would become a contract assembler for the company's Endurance pickup truck. The deal was completed in May 2022 for a final price of $230 million. It was announced Foxconn would also invest $50 million into the company through a purchase of common stock.

Major customers
The following list consists of Foxconn's present or past major customers. The list is provided in alphabetical order.

Their country of origin or base of operations is in parentheses.

North America 

Amazon.com (United States)
Apple Inc. (United States)
BlackBerry Ltd. (Canada) 
Cisco (United States)
Dell (United States)
Fisker Inc (United States) 
Google (United States)
Hewlett-Packard (United States)
InFocus (United States)
Intel (United States)
Microsoft (United States)
Motorola Mobility (United States)
Vizio (United States)

Asia 

Acer Inc. (Taiwan)
Huawei (China)
Lenovo (China)
Nintendo (Japan)
Sega (Japan)
Sony (Japan)
Toshiba (Japan)
Xiaomi (China)

Europe 

HMD Global, under Nokia brand (Finland)

Subsidiaries

FIH Mobile
FIH Mobile is a subsidiary of Foxconn, offering services such as product development and after-sales support. It was incorporated in the tax haven of the Cayman Islands in 2000.

On 18 May 2016, FIH Mobile announced the purchase of Microsoft Mobile's feature phone business. Microsoft Mobile Vietnam is also part of the sale to FIH Mobile, which consists of the Hanoi, Vietnam manufacturing facility. The rest of the business has been sold to a new Finland-based company HMD Global, which started developing and selling new Nokia-branded devices in early 2017. The total sale to both companies amounted to US$350 million. FIH Mobile is now manufacturing new Nokia-branded devices developed by HMD.

Foxtron
Foxtron is a joint venture of Foxconn and Yulon Group founded in 2020 for vehicular manufacturing and research and development of electric vehicles.

Foxlink Group
Foxlink Group is a Foxconn affiliate.

Shinfox Energy
Shinfox Energy is a Foxlink Group subsidiary.

Foxwell Power
Foxwell Power is a subsidiary of Shinfox Energy. Foxwell Power contracted with corporate great-grandparent Foxconn to supply 2.36 million kWh of green electricity in 2022.

Controversies

Foxconn has been involved in several controversies relating to employee grievances or treatment. Foxconn has more than a million employees. In China, it employed more people than any other private company

Working conditions
Allegations of poor working conditions have been made on several occasions. News reports highlight the long working hours, discrimination against Mainland Chinese workers by their Taiwanese co-workers, and lack of working relationships at the company. Although Foxconn was found to be compliant in the majority of areas when Apple Inc. audited the maker of its iPods and iPhones in 2007, the audit did substantiate several of the allegations. In May 2010, Shanghaiist reported that security guards had been caught beating factory workers.

In reaction to a spate of negative press, particularly that involving worker suicides in which 14 people died from January to May 2010, Steve Jobs defended Apple's relationship with the company in June 2010, citing that its Chinese partner is "pretty nice" and is "not a sweatshop". Meanwhile, however, a report jointly produced by 20 universities in Hong Kong, Taiwan, and Mainland China described Foxconn factories as labour camps with widespread worker abuse and illegal overtime.

Concerns increased in early 2012 by an article published in The New York Times in October 2011. It reported evidence that substantiated some of the criticisms. The 2012 audit commissioned by Apple Inc. and performed by the Fair Labor Association found that workers were routinely subjected to inhumane bouts of overtime of up to 34 hours without a pay increase and suggested that debilitating workplace accidents and suicides may be common. A Hong Kong non-profit organisation, Students and Scholars Against Corporate Misbehaviour, has written numerous negative reports on Foxconn's treatment of its employees, such as in 2010 and 2011. These typically find far worse conditions than the 2012 Fair Labour Association audit did, but they rely on a far smaller number of employee informants, circa 100 to 170. The Fair Labor Association audit in 2012 used interviews with 35,000 Foxconn employees.

In January 2012, about 150 Foxconn employees threatened to commit a mass suicide in protest of their working conditions. One worker said the protest resulted from 600 workers being moved into a new "unbearable" factory location. In September 2012, a fight at worker dormitories in Taiyuan, Shanxi, where a guard allegedly was beating a worker, escalated into a riot involving 2,000 people and was quelled by security.

In October 2012, the company admitted that 14-year-old children had worked for a short time at a facility in Yantai, Shandong Province, as part of an internship programme, in violation of the age limit of 16 for legal workers. Foxconn said that the workers had been brought in to help deal with a labor shortage, and Xinhua quoted an official saying that 56 underage interns would be returned to their schools. Reuters quoted Foxconn saying that 2.7 percent of its workforce in China were long- or short-term interns. In response to the scrutiny, Foxconn said it would cut overtime from the current 20 hours per week to less than nine hours a week.

Also in October 2012, there was a crisis concerning an injured worker in which 26-year-old Zhang Tingzhen suffered an electric shock and fell in a factory accident a year earlier. His doctors did immediate surgery to remove part of his brain, "[after which] he lost his memory and can neither speak, walk". When his father attempted to get compensation in 2012, Reuters reported that Foxconn told the family to transport and submit him for a disability assessment in Huizhou 70 km away, or it would cut off funding for his treatment. His doctors protested the move for fear of a brain haemorrhage en route, and the company stated that it was acting within labour laws. His family later sued Foxconn in 2012 and argued in court that Tingzhen had been summoned to the wrong city. In 2014, a court ruled that he had to be assessed in Huizhou to receive compensation, with Foxconn offering a settlement for the father to recant his criticisms, which was refused.

In February 2015, Beijing News reported that an official with the All China Federation of Trade Union (ACFTU), Guo Jun, said that Foxconn allegedly forced employees to work overtime, resulting in occasional death by karōshi or suicide. Jun also said that the illegal overtime resulted from a lack of investigation and light punishments. Foxconn, in return, issued a statement questioning Guo's allegations, arguing workers wanted to work overtime to earn more money.

In November 2017, the Financial Times reported that it had found several students working 11-hour days at the iPhone X plant in Henan province, violating the 40-hour-per-week mandate for children. In response, Foxconn announced that it has stopped the interns' illegal overtime work at the factory in which 3,000 students had been hired that September.

Since 2016, Foxconn has been replacing its workforce with robots, which have replaced 50% of Foxconn's labor force in 2016, and there are plans for completely automated factories.

In 2019, a report was issued by Taiwan News stating that some of Foxconn's managers had fraudulently used rejected parts to build iPhones.

In late 2022, working conditions were exacerbated by Zero-COVID policies leading to protests.

Suicides

Suicides among Foxconn workers have attracted the media's attention. Among the first cases to attract attention in the press was the death of Sun Danyong, a 25-year-old man who committed suicide in July 2009 after reporting the loss of an iPhone 4 prototype in his possession. According to The Telegraph, Sun Danyong had been beaten by security guards.

There was also a series of suicides speculatively linked to low pay in 2010, though employees also noted that Foxconn paid higher wages than similar jobs. In reaction to a spate of worker suicides in which 14 people died in 2010, Foxconn installed suicide-prevention netting at the base of buildings in some facilities and promised to offer substantially higher wages at its Shenzhen production bases. In 2011, Foxconn also hired the PR firm Burson-Marsteller to help deal with the negative publicity from the suicides. That year, the nets seemed to help lower the death rate, although at least four employees died by throwing themselves off buildings.

In January 2012, there was a protest by workers about conditions in Wuhan, with 150 workers threatening to commit mass suicide if factory conditions were not improved. In 2012 and into 2013, three young Foxconn employees were reported to have died by jumping off buildings. In January 2018, another suicide was reported by a factory worker, after 31-year old Li Ming jumped to his death off a building in Zhengzhou, where the iPhone X was being manufactured.

The Wisconsin Valley Project

The project originally committed in 2017 to investing $10 billion and employing up to 13,000 workers but has now shrunk to $672 million with 1,454 jobs.

Food poisoning 
On 15 December 2021, 256 workers at Foxconn's Sriperumbudur factory developed Acute Diarrhoeal Disease due to food poisoning after eating food at the company-provided hostel. As a result of which, 159 workers were hospitalized. The workers were provided no information about this, due to which a rumor started spreading among the workers through Whatsapp that two workers had died. By 17 December there were sit-in protests in worker dormitories, by 10 pm of the same day, thousands of women workers of the factory staged protests on the Chennai-Bengaluru national highway, this was met by police detention of 67 women protestors and arrest of one journalist, with many of them being released a day later. Following the protests the factory was shut down for a week, with the state government and district administration investigating the worker conditions. On 22 December the Food Safety Department sealed the kitchen of the dormitory finding rats and poor drainage. The rooms provided to workers were overcrowded, with them being forced to sleep on the floor, some even lacking toilets with a running water supply. Following the revelation of substandard living conditions, on 29 December Apple put the Foxconn plant on probation, with both Apple and Foxconn issuing statements on the dormitory and dining rooms conditions. In January 2022, after assuring Apple and the Tamil Nadu government that it had taken the necessary corrective measures, Foxconn began reopening its factory and resuming work in phases.

Mobility in Harmony Consortium 
The Mobility in Harmony Consortium was created in 2020 by Foxconn to promote a set of open standards for electric vehicles.

See also

 2010 Chinese labour unrest
 List of companies of Taiwan
 List of electronics companies
Luxshare
 Pegatron
 Wistron

References

Further reading
  
 
 
 
 Ngai, Pun, and Jenny Chan. "Global capital, the state, and Chinese workers: The Foxconn experience." Modern China 38.4 (2012): 383-410.

External links

 
Companies listed on the Taiwan Stock Exchange
Electronics companies of Taiwan
Former companies in the Hang Seng Index
Electronics companies established in 1974
Manufacturing companies of Taiwan
Mobile phone manufacturers
Motherboard companies
Electric vehicle industry
Multinational companies headquartered in Taiwan
1974 establishments in Taiwan